Freilassing, until 1923 Salzburghofen is a town of some 16,000 inhabitants in the southeastern corner of Bavaria, Germany. It belongs to the "Regierungsbezirk" Oberbayern and the "Landkreis" (County) of Berchtesgadener Land. 
Located very close to the German-Austrian border, Freilassing can be seen as the biggest satellite of Salzburg, the  centre of which is eight kilometres (five miles) away, on the other side of the border.

History
As proved by excavations the area was already settled in the Neolithic times. Celts and later Romans established permanent settlements. First mentioned 885 in a Carolingian document, the peasant village named Salzburghofen was given to the archbishop of Salzburg by king Louis IV in 908. After the Napoleonic Wars in 1816, the border between Bavaria and Austria was drawn along the rivers Saalach and Salzach, and Salzburghofen became part of Bavaria. The railway line connecting Munich and Salzburg (and further on to Vienna) changed the appearance of the village significantly. First, the railway company paid good prices for the land of the farmers. Second, many jobs were created, more than 1,000 in the 1970s.

In 1923, the name of the village was changed to Freilassing. Since the railway was of strategic interest and was also used by top Nazis on their way to Berchtesgaden during the war, Freilassing became a target for the Allied forces. In addition a depot of the Wehrmacht (the German army) was situated close to the station. On April 25, 1945, only a few days before the end of World War II, British and American bombers destroyed Freilassing almost completely.

Due to the expulsion of many Germans out of the eastern territories, the population of Freilassing grew and reached 7,700 in 1952. Thus Freilassing became "Stadt" (city) in 1954. Since then, the population has doubled.

Geography
Freilassing is located in the valley of the rivers Salzach and Saalach which merge close to the northern part of the town. To the south and the east the Alps arise to altitudes of more than 2,000 m. To the north and west rolling hills dominate the landscape.

Economy
Cattle farming and timber industry were major economic branches before the railroad era.
The railway has dominated the economy for a long time since the construction of the Munich–Salzburg line in 1860. Beginning in the mid-1970s, the DB (German railways) gradually centralized their organization. Hence the importance of the railway as an employer diminished. Several small and midsize companies, especially in mechanical engineering provide jobs.

Transportation
Trains stop at Freilassing Station.

Born in Freilassing 

 Florian Grassl (born 1980), skeleton pilot
  (1900-1982), aviation engineer and university professor
 Hans Schaidinger (born 1949), former mayor of Regensburg
 Katharina Trost, athlete

Gallery

See also
 Freilassing, Geschichte einer jungen Stadt; Kurt Enzinger, Rupertus-Verlag 2003,

References

External links
  

Berchtesgadener Land